The Mentawai Islands Regency are a chain of about seventy islands and islets approximately  off the western coast of Sumatra in Indonesia. They cover 6,033.76 km2 and had a population of 76,173 at the 2010 Census and 87,623 at the 2020 Census. The other major islands are Sipura (or Sipora), North Pagai (Pagai Utara), and South Pagai (Pagai Selatan). The islands lie off the Sumatran coast, across the Mentawai Strait. The indigenous inhabitants of the islands are known as the Mentawai people. The Mentawai Islands have become a noted destination for surfing, with over 40 boats offering surf charters to international guests.

Administrative districts 

The Mentawai Islands have been administered as a regency within the West Sumatra (Sumatera Barat) province since 1999. The regency seat is Tua Pejat, on the island of Sipora. Padang, the capital of the province, lies on the Sumatran mainland opposite Siberut. The regency is divided into ten districts (kecamatan), tabulated below from south to north with their areas and their populations at the 2010 Census and the 2020 Census. The table also includes the locations of the district administrative centres, the number of villages (rural desa and urban kelurahan) in each district, and its post code.

Note: (a) Sikakap District covers the northern part of South Pagai Island and the southern part of North Pagai Island, plus some intervening small islands.

Villages
Administrative villages (desa) listed for each district:

Tourism

Surfing
The first photos of the surf breaks in the Mentawais area were leaked after a surf trip in 1992 aboard the MV Indies Trader, with professional surfers Ross Clarke-Jones, Tom Carroll, and Martin Potter. Ever since then, the Mentawai Islands have been well on the radar of surf travellers around the world. At the West of Sumatra, the Mentawai Islands have the most consistent surf breaks in Indonesia making it one of the preferred choices for serious surfers. The tropical waters surrounding the islands offer year-round waves up to 15 ft (4.5 m).

Ecology 

The islands have been separated from Sumatra since the mid-Pleistocene period, which has allowed at least twenty endemic species to develop amongst its flora and fauna. This includes six endemic primates: the Kloss's gibbon (Hylobates klossii), Mentawai macaque (Macaca pagensis), Siberut macaque (Macaca siberu), Mentawai langur (Presbytis potenziani), Siberut langur (Presbytis siberu), and pig-tailed langur (Simias concolor). They are highly endangered due to logging, unsustainable hunting, and conversion of rainforest to palm oil plantations. Some areas of the Mentawai Islands rainforest ecoregion are protected, such as the Siberut National Park. Red junglefowl, the Asian palm civet and crab-eating macaque are also native.

Seismic activity 

The Mentawai Islands lie above the Sunda megathrust, a seismically active zone responsible for many great earthquakes. This megathrust runs along the southwestern side of Sumatra island, forming the interface between the Eurasian Plate and Indo-Australian Plate.

Earthquake and tsunami activity has been high since the 2004 Indian Ocean earthquake. In 1833, the region was hit with an earthquake, possibly similar in size to the 2004 Indian Ocean earthquake; another large earthquake struck in 1797. On October 25, 2010, an earthquake in southern Sumatra led to a deadly tsunami that devastated villages in South and North Pagai. On March 3, 2016, an earthquake of 7.8 magnitude occurred off the Indian Ocean, a few hundred kilometres from Mentawai islands, as a result of strike-slip faulting within the oceanic lithosphere of the Indo-Australia plate.

See also 

 Mentawai ethnic group
 Mentawai Festival

Notes

External links 

 
 Anthropology of the Mentawai Islands
 Native Planet: The Mentawai

 
Archipelagoes of Indonesia
Islands of Sumatra
Surfing locations in Indonesia
Tropical and subtropical moist broadleaf forests
Volcanic arc islands
Islands of the Indian Ocean
Populated places in Indonesia